Assault is a 1971 British thriller film directed by Sidney Hayers and starring Suzy Kendall, Frank Finlay, Freddie Jones, and Lesley-Anne Down; David Essex also has a small role. It is based on the 1962 novel The Ravine by Kendal Young, and tells about a police attempt to track down a dangerous rapist/killer on the loose. In the U.S., it was retitled In the Devil's Garden.

Premise
After a schoolgirl is raped on her way home from school, police move in to investigate the case. After a further girl is attacked and killed, they call in the assistance of a doctor and a local schoolteacher to help solve the case.

Cast
 Suzy Kendall as Julie West
 Frank Finlay as Det. Chief Supt. Velyan
 Freddie Jones as Reporter
 James Laurenson as Greg Lomax
 Lesley-Anne Down as Tessa Hurst
 Tony Beckley as Leslie Sanford
 Anthony Ainley as Mr. Bartell
 Dilys Hamlett as Mrs. Sanford
 James Cosmo as Det. Sgt. Beale
 Patrick Jordan as Sgt. Milton
 Allan Cuthbertson as Coroner
 Anabel Littledale  as Susan Miller
 Tom Chatto as Police Doctor
 Kit Taylor as Doctor
 Jan Butlin as Day Receptionist
 William Hoyland as Chemist in Hospital
 John Swindells as Desk Sergeant
 Jill Carey as Night Receptionist
 David Essex as Man in Chemist Shop
 Valerie Shute as Girl in Chemist Shop
 John Stone as Fire Chief
 Siobhan Quinlan as Jenny Greenaway
 Marianne Stone as Matron
 Janet Lynn as Girl in Library

References

External links
 

1971 films
1970s thriller films
British thriller films
1970s English-language films
Films about rape
Films directed by Sidney Hayers
Films shot at Pinewood Studios
Folk horror films
1970s British films